Caesar Augustin von Ramdohr (September 4, 1853 or 1855 – 1913) was an American obstetrician and emeritus professor of the New York Post-Graduate Medical School. He qualified as a physician at New York University in 1877. He was of German origin and petitioned for American citizenship in 1878.

References 

1850s births
1913 deaths
Year of birth missing
New York University Grossman School of Medicine faculty
New York University alumni
German emigrants to the United States
American obstetricians